Sue Me is a song by Sabrina Carpenter. 

Sue Me may also refer to:

"Sue Me", song written by Frank Loesser from Guys and Dolls, 1950
"Sue Me", song by Kurt Nilsen from album I, 2003
"Sue Me", single by Korean group Bastarz and Groovy Room, 2015
"Sue Me", song by Björk from Utopia, 2017
"Sue Me", song by Wale from Wow... That's Crazy, 2019